The 49th Infantry Division was a military formation of the German Heer (Army) which served during the later years of the Second World War.

History 
On 1 February 1944, the 191st Reserve Division was reorganised in the Boulogne-sur-Mer area of Militärverwaltung in Belgien und Nordfrankreich (Military Administration in Belgium and Northern France).  After formation the division was used for coastal defence between Boulogne-sur-Mer and Étaples.  In mid-August 1944 the division was relocated to Paris and eventually back into the Low Countries, and was smashed at the Battle of Mons (near the Albert Canal) by the 21st Army Group.  The divisional commander, Lt Gen Siegfried Macholz, tried to reorganise his shattered units at Hasselt, but managed to assemble only 1,5000 men – mostly support troops who had no anti-tank guns and only piece of artillery: a Soviet 122 mm gun M1931/37 (A-19).  Only one regimental headquarters – the 148th Grenadiers – could be located.  Soon (on or about 4 September) Macholz (who had commanded the division since its formation) was replaced by Lt Gen Erich Baessler.

The division was briefly withdrawn from the line and, on 19 October 1944, absorbed the 31st and 57th Fortress Machine Gun Battalions, the 302nd and 505th Infantry Regiments (from HQ Oberkommando der Wehrmacht), the 1423rd Fortress Infantry Battalion, a grenadier replacement and training battalion, and the I, VI, XI, and XVIII Landwehr Fortress Battalions.

The division was soon back in action north of Aachen, but was withdrawn after the city fell and was disbanded shortly afterwards (on 23 November 1944).  The survivors of the division were sent to the 246th Volksgrenadier Division, while the divisional staff was sent to Metz and used to form the Staff of VII Panzer Corps.

Organisation 
The organisation of the division was as follows:

 Divisional Headquarters
 149th Signal Battalion
 148th Grenadier Regiment
 149th Grenadier Regiment
 150th Grenadier Regiment
 49th Füsilier Battalion
 149th Artillery Regiment
 149th Panzerjäger Battalion
 149th Engineer Battalion
 149th Divisional Supply Troops

Commanders 
Commanders of the division were:

 1 February–4 September 1944: General der Infanterie Siegfried Macholz
 4 September–23 November 1944: General der Infanterie Erich Baessler

Footnotes

References 

 
 

Military units and formations of the Wehrmacht
1944 establishments in Germany
Military units and formations established in 1944
Military units and formations disestablished in 1944
0*049